August Cinema is an Indian film production and distribution company based in Trivandrum. Formed in 2011, it was found by Shaji Nadesan, Santosh Sivan and Prithviraj Sukumaran. Later, actor Arya joined in 2015. In June 2017, Prithviraj announced that he was leaving the company.

Patrons 
 Shaji Nadesan, producer and actor

 Santosh Sivan, cinematographer
 Arya, actor

Films

References

External links
 Official Website

Film production companies of Kerala
Film distributors of India
Companies based in Thiruvananthapuram
Entertainment companies established in 2011
2011 establishments in Kerala
Indian companies established in 2011